St. Mark's Episcopal Church, also known as St. Marks P.E. Church, is a historic church located at 210 University Ave. in Tonopah, Nevada, United States. The church was built from 1906 to 1907 by stonemason E.E. Burdick. Burdick's work on the church has been called "some of the finest craftsmanship to be found in Tonopah". Architect G.B. Lyons designed the church in the Gothic Revival style; his design features Gothic arches at the windows and front entrance and gables topped with crosses on the roof and the entrance.

The church was added to the National Register of Historic Places on May 20, 1982.

The E.E. Burdick House, next door, built by Burdick for use as his own residence, was later purchased by the church for use as a rectory, and is also National Register-listed.

References

Episcopal church buildings in Nevada
Tonopah, Nevada
Buildings and structures in Nye County, Nevada
Churches completed in 1907
National Register of Historic Places in Tonopah, Nevada
Churches on the National Register of Historic Places in Nevada
1907 establishments in Nevada
Gothic Revival church buildings in Nevada